Gordon Russell may refer to:

Gordon Russell (writer) (1929–1981), American scriptwriter
Gordon J. Russell (1859–1919), U.S. Representative from Texas and federal judge
Gordon Russell (footballer), Scottish former footballer and manager
Sir Gordon Russell (designer) (1892–1980), English designer